The North Melbourne Football Club, also known as the Kangaroos, is an Australian Football League club based in North Melbourne, just  north of Melbourne metropolitan area. The North Melbourne Football Club was formed in 1869. It was purportedly established to satisfy the needs of local cricketers who were keen to keep themselves fit and healthy over the winter months. They entered the Victorian Football League (VFL) in 1925 after 48 years in the Victorian Football Association (VFA).

Wels Eicke became the first coach of the Kangaroos in the 1925 season, serving for two seasons before retiring after the 1926 season. In terms of tenure, Denis Pagan has coached more games (240) and seasons (10) than any other coach in the club's history. He coached the Kangaroos to two AFL Premierships in the 1996 season and then again in the 1999 season. In terms of successfulness, Ron Barassi has been more successful (65.91% win–loss record) than any other coach in the club's history. There have been 7 coaches in the North Melbourne Football Club's history that have been inducted to the Australian Football Hall of Fame. There have been eleven captain-coaches in Kangaroos history. First, in 1925, coach Wels Eicke become the first captain-coach in Kangaroos history. He played only 21 games for the Kangaroos and coached 20 of those games.

Key

Statistics are correct to the end of round 22, 2022.

Coaches

Notes
 A running total of the number of coaches of the Kangaroos. Thus any coach who has two separate terms as head coach is only counted once.
 Thomas coach the Kangaroos for a single match in 1926, while a replacement coach was found after the resignation of Wels Eicke.
 Cameron coach for four games as Dick Taylor out suspended for four weeks for elbowing opponent.
 Cusack coached final two games of season after Keith Forbes out suspended for threatening umpire.
 Jordan coached the Kangaroos for a single match in 1976.
 Dugdale coached the Kangaroos for a single match in Round 12, 1977.
 Adams replaced Noble as caretaker coach for the last six games of the 2022 season.

References

North Melbourne Football Club coaches

North Melbourne Football Club coaches